Calicium laevigatum is a crustose lichen that is found growing on trees in the South West region of Western Australia.

References

laevigatum
Lichen species
Lichens described in 2006
Lichens of Australia
Taxa named by Leif Tibell